The County of Croajingolong is one of the 37 counties of Victoria which are part of the cadastral divisions of Australia, used for land titles. It is the most easterly county, and includes the Croajingolong National Park. Its western boundary is the Snowy River. The county was proclaimed in 1871 together with others from the Gipps Land District.  Some time earlier maps showed proposed counties of Howe and Combermere occupying the area of Croajingolong.

Parishes 
Parishes include:
 Baawang, Victoria
 Barga, Victoria
 Bemm, Victoria
 Bendock, Victoria
 Betka, Victoria
 Bidwell, Victoria
 Bonang, Victoria
 Bondi, Victoria
 Boorpuk, Victoria
 Bralak, Victoria
 Brindat, Victoria
 Bullamalk, Victoria
 Bungywarr, Victoria
 Cabanandra, Victoria
 Cobon, Victoria
 Combienbar, Victoria
 Cooaggalah, Victoria
 Coopracambra, Victoria
 Curlip, Victoria
 Deddick, Victoria
 Dellicknora, Victoria
 Derndang, Victoria
 Errinundra, Victoria
 Gabo, Victoria
 Goolengook, Victoria
 Goongerah, Victoria
 Jilwain, Victoria
 Jingallala, Victoria
 Jirrah, Victoria
 Karlo, Victoria
 Kirkenong, Victoria
 Koola, Victoria
 Kooragan, Victoria
 Kowat, Victoria
 Kuark, Victoria
 Loomat, Victoria
 Loongelaat, Victoria
 Mallacoota, Victoria
 Maramingo, Victoria
 Moonkan, Victoria
 Murrungowar, Victoria
 Nerran, Victoria
 Noonga, Victoria
 Noorinbee, Victoria
 Nungal, Victoria
 Orbost, Victoria
 Orbost East, Victoria
 Pinnak, Victoria
 Purgagoolah, Victoria
 Tabbara, Victoria
 Tamboon, Victoria
 Thurra, Victoria
 Tingaringy, Victoria
 Tonghi, Victoria
 Toonyarak, Victoria
 Tubbut, Victoria
 Wangarabell, Victoria
 Wat Wat, Victoria
 Wau Wauka, Victoria
 Wau Wauka West, Victoria
 Weeragua, Victoria
 Wibenduck, Victoria
 Wingan, Victoria
 Winyar, Victoria
 Wooyoot, Victoria
 Wurrin, Victoria
 Wyangil, Victoria
 Yalmy, Victoria
 Yarak, Victoria

References
Vicnames, place name details
Research aids, Victoria 1910
Map of the counties of Benambra, Tambo, Croajingolong and Dargo in Victoria showing county boundaries, parish boundaries, main roads, telegraph lines and railways. 1886, J. Sands. National Library of Australia

Counties of Victoria (Australia)